On Lok Tsuen is a village and industrial area in Fanling, North District, Hong Kong.

Administration
On Lok Tsuen is one of the villages represented within the Fanling District Rural Committee. For electoral purposes, On Lok Tsuen is part of the Fanling Town constituency, which is currently represented by Wong Hoi-ying.

References

External links

 Delineation of area of existing village On Lok Tsuen (East) (Fanling) for election of resident representative (2019 to 2022)
 Delineation of area of existing village On Lok Tsuen (West) (Fanling) for election of resident representative (2019 to 2022)

Villages in North District, Hong Kong
Fanling